Mount McCoy (previously known as Verde Hill) is a 1,325-foot-high peak in Simi Valley, California known for its characteristic 12 foot white cross on the top. There are numerous trails leading to Mount McCoy, which sits in a  nature area operated by the Rancho Simi Recreation and Park District (RSRPD), while the cross and its immediate surroundings are owned by the Simi Valley Historical Society. By 1813, the cross on Mt. McCoy was a landmark for the Friars and others in the Simi Valley.

An 1858 map of the Simi Valley does show a cross on Mt. McCoy, but a newer cross was erected by Robert E. Harrington in 1921, and a concrete one later in 1941. Mount McCoy has been a landmark for the area since before the town was founded. In 1986, Mount McCoy was designated Ventura County Landmark No. 106. The main trailhead is located at 2 Washburn Street at the western end of Simi Valley. A trailhead to a shorter hiking trail is located around 56-58 Presidential Drive on the way to the Ronald Reagan Presidential Library. 

From the top of Mount McCoy there are views of the Simi Hills and Simi Valley, as well as Simi Peak, open-space areas and the Ronald Reagan Presidential Library. There are also views of the Santa Monica Mountains, Mount Baldy, the San Gabriel Mountains and the Topatopa Mountains, and on clear days, even the Ojai backcountry, the Channel Islands and the Pacific Ocean. It is one of two crosses overlooking the Simi Valley, the other one being situated by the Santa Susana Pass and Rocky Peak by the Santa Susana portion of eastern Simi Valley.

See also
 Ventura County Historic Landmarks & Points of Interest

References

McCoy
Geography of Simi Valley, California
Parks in Ventura County, California
Simi Hills
McCoy